The Iona–Skeleton Coast Transfrontier Conservation Area is a proposed transfrontier conservation area for which four areas are being considered as components.

Two in Angola are the:
 Iona National Park, and the
 Namibe Partial Reserve.

The Namibian components will be the:
 Skeleton Coast National Park that shares a common boundary with Iona National Park along the Cunene River, and a proposed contractual conservation area involving local communities in the Kunene and Erongo Regions. This area is provisionally known as the
 North West People’s Conservation Area (Also known as NWPCA).

See also
List of national parks of Namibia

Nature conservation in Angola
Nature conservation in Namibia